Ülejõe is a village in Anija Parish, Harju County, Estonia, just northeast of the town of Kehra. 

The village is situated on the right bank of the Jägala river. Aavoja river flows into Jägala river in the village.

Aavoja Reservoir is situated in the southeastern part of the village, Kehra pulp mill's landfill is located in the central part of the village.

As of August 1, 2020, the village had a population of 243.

References

Further reading 
 Miidla, Ants (2014). Kehra Lood (in Estonian). MTÜ Kehra Raudteejaam. .

External links 
 Anija Parish homepage

Villages in Harju County